Genrikh Averyanovich Borovik (born 16 November 1929, Minsk) is a Soviet and Russian publicist, writer, playwright and filmmaker, the father of journalist Artyom Borovik.

According to Vasili Mitrokhin, Borovik was a KGB agent in the United States, one of whose successful projects was promotion of false John F. Kennedy assassination theories through writer Mark Lane.

In 1967, as senior APN correspondent in the US, Borovik was reported to have "sounded out the possibility of broadcasting a program about Vietnam on the network of one of the largest American television corporations".

He also wrote a book about famous Soviet spy Kim Philby.

Borovik was the fourth and the last chairman of the Soviet Peace Committee, in the years 1987–1991.

References

1929 births
20th-century Russian dramatists and playwrights
20th-century Russian journalists
20th-century Russian male writers
21st-century Russian dramatists and playwrights
21st-century Russian journalists
21st-century Russian male writers
Living people
Writers from Minsk
Resigned Communist Party of the Soviet Union members
Honorary Members of the Russian Academy of Arts
Moscow State Institute of International Relations alumni
Recipients of the Order "For Merit to the Fatherland", 3rd class
Recipients of the Order "For Merit to the Fatherland", 4th class
Recipients of the Order of Friendship of Peoples
Recipients of the Order of the Red Banner of Labour
Recipients of the USSR State Prize
Russian male dramatists and playwrights
Russian male journalists
Russian male writers
20th-century Russian screenwriters
Male screenwriters
Soviet dramatists and playwrights
Soviet journalists
Soviet male writers
Soviet screenwriters